George Washington "Dibo" Johnson (April 20, 1890 – August 6, 1940) was an American baseball outfielder in the Negro leagues.

On July 6, 1918, Johnson broke his leg in a game. However, he would play baseball for the next decade. He played from 1918 to 1931, playing mostly with the Hilldale Club. He led the Eastern Colored League in home runs (eight), runs batted in (46), and stolen bases (13) in 1923 while batting .352. He batted .328 in 1925.

He participated in Negro league baseball history by playing the club in the second-ever postseason series held between black baseball teams in 1921. Hilldale was matched against the Chicago American Giants, champions of the "West" and the Negro National League. Johnson would hit a home run in both Game 4 and 5, making him the first player to hit home runs in consecutive Negro league postseason games; Hilldale would win the Series after defeating Chicago three games to two (with one tie). With the bases loaded and leading by three in Game 6 of the 1925 Colored World Series, Johnson caught the final out of the 1925 Colored World Series in center field, clinching the first and only Negro World Series title for Hilldale.

References

External links
 and Baseball-Reference Black Baseball stats and Seamheads

1890 births
1940 deaths
Hilldale Club players
Lincoln Giants players
Brooklyn Royal Giants players
Bacharach Giants players
Sportspeople from San Marcos, Texas
Baseball players from Texas
20th-century African-American sportspeople
Baseball outfielders